Altor Equity Partners is a private equity firm focused on leveraged buyout and growth capital investments in Sweden, Denmark, Finland, Norway and the DACH region.

History

As of 2015, the firm has raised approximately €6.2 billion since inception across three funds. The firm completed fundraising for its first investment vehicle, the Altor 2003 Fund in May 2003 with €650 million of investor commitments.  Altor Fund II was closed in March 2006 €1.2 billion of capital and Altor Fund III closed in August 2008 with €2.0 billion of commitments. Altor closed its fourth fund in July 2014, also with €2 billion in commitments.
Altor closed its most recent fifth fund in 2019, with €2.5 billion in commitments.

Notable Investments
In 2006, Altor purchased Norwegian outdoor clothing retailer Helly Hansen from Investcorp for an undisclosed amount. In 2012 the firm sold 75 percent of the company to the Ontario Teachers’ Pension Plan for about $326 million, reportedly 4 times what they paid for it.

The firm bought the French ski manufacturer Skis Rossignol from a group led by Macquarie in July 2013 for an undisclosed amount.

In August 2021, Altor acquired a majority stake in Swedish video game publisher Raw Fury for an undisclosed price.

References

Other sources

External links
Altor Equity Partners company website

Private equity firms of Sweden
Financial services companies established in 2003
2003 establishments in Sweden
Companies established in 2003
Financial services companies of Sweden